Jerome Lamy (born Linz, 1726 and died 1781) was an 18th-century Benedictine Biblical scholar and teacher at Salzburg.

Bibliography

Introductio in Vetus Testamentum (2 vols., Steyr, 1765);
Introductio in sancta quatuor Evangelia (Venice, 1775);
Introductio in Acta Apostolorum (Pavia, 1782);
Fasciculus Myrrhæ, a commentary on the Passion (Steyr, 1766);
Die sieben Busspsalmen (Salzburg, 1776).

External links
 Catholic Encyclopedia Article

Academic staff of the University of Salzburg
1726 births
1781 deaths
Austrian male writers
Austrian Benedictines